This is a list of companies named after people. For other lists of eponyms (names derived from people) see Lists of etymologies. All of these are named after founders, co-founders and partners of companies, unless otherwise stated.

#
 20th Century Fox – William Fox

A
 A. G. Edwards – Albert Gallatin Edwards
 A&M Records – Herb Alpert and Jerry Moss
 A&W Restaurants – Roy Allen and Frank Wright
 Abbott Laboratories – Wallace Calvin Abbott (1888)
 Abercrombie & Fitch – David T. Abercrombie and Ezra Fitch
 Abrams Air Craft – Talbert Abrams
 Abt Sportsline – Johann Abt
 Adam Opel AG – Adam Opel
 Adidas – Adi Dassler (Adolf Dassler)
 Aditya Birla Group – Ghanshyam Das Birla
 Agusta – Giovanni Agusta
 AGV – Gino Amisano (Amisano Gino Valenza)
 Air Jordan – Michael Jordan
 Aitken Spence – Patrick Gordon Spence, Edward Aitken and S.R. Aitken
 Ajo Motorsport – Aki Ajo
 ALAN – Alberto and Annamaria, children of founder Falconi Lodovico
 Albert Heijn and Ahold (Albert Heijn Holdings) – Albert Heijn
 Albertsons – Joe Albertson
 Aldi – Theo and Karl Albrecht (Albrecht Discount)
 Alessi – Giovanni Alessi
 Alex von Falkenhausen Motorenbau – Alex von Falkenhausen
 Alltech — Aoife Louise Lyons, daughter of company founder Pearse Lyons
 Alza – Alex Zaffaroni
 Amdahl Corporation – Gene Amdahl
 AMG – Hans Werner Aufrecht and Erhard Melcher (Aufrecht Melcher Großaspach)
 Amon – Chris Amon
 Amstrad – Alan Sugar (Alan Michael Sugar Trading)
 Anatra – Artur Antonovich Anatra
 Andrea Moda Formula – Andrea Sassetti
 Angie's List – Angie Hicks
 Anheuser-Busch – Lilly and Eberhard Anheuser, and Adolphus Busch
 Ann Summers – Annice Summers, secretary of founder Michael Caborn-Waterfield
 Ansaldo – Giovanni Ansaldo
 The Anschutz Corporation – Philip Anschutz
 Ansett Australia – Reg Ansett
 Ansett Pioneer – Reg Ansett
 Antonov – Oleg Antonov
 Arai Helmet – Hirotake Arai
 Archer Daniels – George A. Archer and John W. Daniels
 Armani – Giorgio Armani
 Arrows – Franco Ambrosio, Alan Rees, Jackie Oliver, Dave Wass, and Tony Southgate
 ARTA – Aguri Suzuki (Autobacs Racing Team Aguri)
 Arzani-Volpini – Egidio Arzani and Gianpaolo Volpini
 AS Watson – Alexander Skirving Watson
 Aston Butterworth – Bill Aston and Archie Butterworth
 Aston Martin – Lionel Martin
 Audemars Piguet - Jules Louis Audemars and Edward Auguste Piguet
 Audi – August Horch (audi is Latin for horch which means listen in English)
 Austin Motor Company – Herbert Austin
 Avery Dennison Corporation – R. Stanton Avery
 AviaBellanca Aircraft – Giuseppe Mario Bellanca

B
 B&H Photo Video – Blimie and Herman
 B&Q – Richard Block and David Quayle
 Babolat – Pierre Babolat (1842–1892)
 Bacardi – Facundo Bacardi
 Baedeker's – Karl Baedeker
 Bajaj Auto – Jamnalal Bajaj, India
 Baker Curb Racing – Gary Baker and Mike Curb
 Baker International (to Baker Hughes) – Reuben C. Baker
 Baldwin Locomotive Works – Matthias W. Baldwin
 Balenciaga – Cristóbal Balenciaga
 Ball Corporation – the Ball Brothers
 Ballet Rambert – Dame Marie Rambert
 Balmain - Pierre Balmain
 Bandini Automobili – Ilario Bandini
 Bang & Olufsen – Peter Bang and Svend Olufsen
 Bankable Productions – Tyra Banks
 Bannatyne's – Duncan Bannatyne
 Banta Corporation – George Banta, Sr.
 Barilla Group – Pietro Barilla
 Barings Bank – Francis Baring and John Baring
 Barclays – James Barclay
 Barnardo's – Thomas John Barnardo
 Barnes & Noble – William Barnes and G. Clifford Noble
 Barneys New York – Barney Pressman
 Bashas' – Eddie Basha, Sr.
 Baskin-Robbins – Burt Baskin and Irv Robbins
 Bass & Co – William Bass
 Bauknecht – Gottlob Bauknecht
 Bausch & Lomb – John Jacob Bausch and Henry Lomb
 Bayer – Friedrich Bayer
 BBS – Heinrich Baumgartner and Klaus Brand (Baumgartner Brand Schiltach)
 BEA Systems – Bill Coleman, Ed Scott, and Alfred Chuang
 Bechtel – Warren A. Bechtel
 Beckman Coulter – Arnold O. Beckman
 Beck's – Heinrich Beck (1873)
 Beecham Group – Thomas Beecham
 Behra – Jean Behra
 Beiersdorf – Paul Carl Beiersdorf
 Bell Aircraft – Lawrence Bell
 Bell Telephone Company, Bell System – Alexander Graham Bell
 Bellasi – Guglielmo Bellasi
 Ben & Jerry's – Ben Cohen and Jerry Greenfield
 Benbros – Jack and Nathan Beneson (Beneson Brothers)
 Benelli – Teresa Benelli
 Benetton Group – Luciano Benetton
 Bentalls – Frank Bentall
 Bentley – W. O. Bentley
 Benz & Cie. (later Daimler-Benz) – Karl Benz
 Beretta – Bartolomeo Beretta
 Beriev – Georgy Beriev
 Bertelsmann – Carl Bertelsmann
 Berluti – Alessandro Berluti
 Berton – Pieter Bervoets and Ron Ton
 Bertone – Giovanni Bertone
 Bianchi Bicycles – Edoardo Bianchi
 Bickerton – Harry Bickerton
 Bimota – Valerio Bianchi, Giuseppe Morri, and Massimo Tamburini
 Bing Lee – Bing Lee (company founder)
 Bird's Custard – Alfred Bird
 Birds Eye – Clarence Birdseye
 Black & Decker (to Stanley Black & Decker) – S. Duncan Black and Alonzo G. Decker
 Blohm + Voss – Hermann Blohm and Ernst Voss
 Bloomberg L.P. – Michael Bloomberg
 Bloomingdale's – Joseph and Lyman G. Bloomingdale
 Blumhouse Productions – Jason Blum
 Boardman Bikes – Chris Boardman
 Bob Bondurant School of High Performance Driving – Bob Bondurant
 Bocar – Bob Carnes
 Boddingtons – Henry Boddington
 The Bodley Head – in honour of Thomas Bodley, whose bust stood above the founders' shop
 Boeing – William Boeing
 Bölkow – Ludwig Bölkow
 Bombardier Inc. – Joseph-Armand Bombardier
 Bomgar – Joel Bomgaars
 Bonhams – Walter Bonham
 Bonnier Group – Gerhard Bonnier
 Booth's Gin – John Booth
 Boots – Jesse Boot
 Borders Group – Tom and Louis Borders
 Boro – Bob and Rody Hoogenboom
 Bosch – Robert Bosch
 Bose Corporation – Amar Bose, Indian 
 Brabham – Jack Brabham
 Brabus – Klaus Brackmann and Bodo Buschmann
 Brad Jones Racing – Brad Jones
 Brains Brewery – Samuel Arthur Brain
 Brawn GP – Ross Brawn
 Brentano's – August Brentano
 Brewco Motorsports – Clarence and Tammy Brewer
 Brian Hart Ltd. – Brian Hart
 Bridgestone – Shojiro Ishibashi; the name comes from a calque translation and transposition of "ishibashi," meaning "stone bridge"
 Briggs & Stratton – Stephen Foster Briggs and Harold M. Stratton
 Britek Motorsport – Jason Bright
 Brooke Bond – Arthur Brooke
 Brooks Locomotive Works – founded by Horatio G. Brooks
 Brooks Sports – anglicized version of "Bruchs," the maiden name of founder Morris Goldberg's wife
 Brun Motorsport – Walter Brun
 Bryant and May – William Bryant and Francis May
 Bugatti – Ettore Bugatti
 Buick – David Dunbar Buick
 Bulgari – Italianized version of the family name of company founder Sotirios Voulgaris
 Bulova – Joseph Bulova
 Burberry – Thomas Burberry
 BVD – Messrs. Bradley, Voorhees and Day

C
 C. H. Robinson Worldwide – Charles Henry Robinson
 C&A – Clemens and August Brenninkmeijer
 Cabela's – Dick Cabela
 Cadbury – John Cadbury
 Cadillac – Antoine Laumet de La Mothe, sieur de Cadillac, founder of Detroit, Michigan
 Cagiva – Giovanni Castiglioni (Castiglioni Giovanni Varese)
 Callaway Cars – Reeves Callaway
 Callaway Golf Company – Ely R. Callaway Jr.
 Calvin Klein – Calvin Klein
 Cammell Laird – Charles Cammell and William Laird
 Campagnolo – Tullio Campagnolo
 Campari – Davide Campari
 Campbell Soup Company – Joseph A. Campbell
 Canon – see Kwanon
 Cargill – William Wallace Cargill
 Carl Zeiss AG – Carl Zeiss
 Carlyle Group – Thomas Carlyle (indirectly, via the Carlyle Hotel)
 Casio – Tadao Kashio
 Cassell – John Cassell 
 Celine – Celine Vipiana
 Cerruti 1881 – Nino Cerruti
 Chanel – Gabrielle "Coco" Chanel
 Charles Schwab Corporation – Charles R. Schwab
 Charles Wells Ltd (now Wells & Young's Brewery) – Charles Wells
 Chase National Bank (to Chase Manhattan Bank and JPMorgan Chase & Co.) – Salmon P. Chase
 Chevrolet – Louis Chevrolet
 Chip Ganassi Racing – Chip Ganassi
 Christian Dior – Christian Dior
 Christian Salvesen – Christian Salvesen
 Christie's – James Christie
 Chrysler – Walter Chrysler
 Citroën – André Citroën
 Cizeta – Claudio Zampolli
 CKE Restaurants – founded as Carl Karcher Enterprises
 Clarks – Cyrus and James Clark
 Claud Butler – Claud Butler
 Clif Bar – Clifford Erickson (father of founder Gary Erickson)
 Cokin – Jean Coquin
 Coles – George Coles
 Colgate-Palmolive – William Colgate
 Collins Radio Company – Arthur A. Collins
 Colnago – Ernesto Colnago
 Coloni – Enzo Coloni
 Colt's Manufacturing Company, Colt Defense, Colt Canada – Samuel Colt
 Condé Nast Publications – Condé Montrose Nast
 Connolly Leather – John Connolly
 Cooper Car Company – Charles and John Cooper
 Coors Brewing Company, Adolph Coors Company – Adolph Coors
 Cord Automobile – Errett Lobban Cord
 Corel – Michael Cowpland (Cowpland Research Laboratory)
 Costa Coffee – Bruno Costa and Sergio Costa
 Cosworth – Mike Costin and Keith Duckworth
 Courage Compétition – Yves Courage
 Cox Enterprises – James M. Cox
 Cox Models – Roy Cox
 Crane & Co. – Stephen Crane or the Crane family
 Cray Research – Seymour Cray
 Crumpler – Stuart Crumpler (co-founder)
 Cummins – Clessie Cummins
 Curtiss Aeroplane and Motor Company (to Curtiss-Wright) – Glenn Curtiss
 Cushman & Wakefield – J.Clydesdale Cushman and Bernard Wakefield

D
 D. G. Yuengling & Son – David Yuengling
 Daimler-Benz (later DaimlerChrysler, now Daimler AG) – Gottlieb Daimler and Karl Benz
 Dallara – Gian Paolo Dallara
 Damiani – Enrico Grassi Damiani
 Danelectro – Nathan Daniel
 Dangote Group – Aliko Dangote
 Danjaq – Dana Broccoli and Jacqueline Saltzman, wives of company founders Albert R. Broccoli and Harry Saltzman
 d’Antin MotoGP – see Pramac d'Antin
 Dargaud – Georges Dargaud
 Dassault Group – Marcel Dassault
 Datsun – Kenjiro Den, Rokuro Aoyama, and Meitaro Takeuchi
 Dauer Sportwagen – Jochen Dauer
 David Jones Limited – David Jones
 David Lloyd Leisure – David Lloyd
 David Price Racing – David Price
 Davis Polk - John W. Davis, a defender of racial segregation and state control of education.
 DBZ Guitars – Dean B. Zelinsky
 De Agostini – Giovanni De Agostini
 De Tomaso – Alejandro de Tomaso
 Dean & DeLuca – Joel Dean and Giorgio DeLuca
 Dean Guitars – Dean Zelinsky
 Debenhams – William Debenham
 formerly Debenham & Freebody – Debenham and Clement Freebody
 Deere & Company – John Deere
 Dell – Michael Dell
 Deloitte – William Welch Deloitte
 DeLorean Motor Company – John DeLorean
 DHL Express – Adrian Dalsey, Larry Hillblom, and Robert Lynn
 Dick Clark Productions – Dick Clark
 Dick Johnson Racing – Dick Johnson
 Dick Smith – Dick Smith
 Dick's Sporting Goods – Dick Stack
 Dillard's – William T. Dillard
 Disney – Walt Disney
 Driscoll's – Dick Driscoll
 Dodge – John and Horace Dodge
 Dolby Laboratories – Ray Dolby
 Dolce & Gabbana – Domenico Dolce and Stefano Gabbana
 Dollond & Aitchison – John and Peter Dollond and James Aitchison
 Don Bluth Productions – Don Bluth
 Double R Racing, formerly Räikkönen Robertson Racing – Kimi Räikkönen and Steve Robertson
 Douglas Aircraft Company (to McDonnell Douglas) – Donald Wills Douglas, Sr.
 The Dow Chemical Company – Herbert Dow
 Dow Jones & Company – Charles Dow and Edward Jones
 D'Oyly Carte Opera Company – Richard D'Oyly Carte
 Dr. Bashi – Golbarg Bashi
 Dr. Oetker – August Oetker
 Ducati – Antonio Cavalieri Ducati (1853–1927)
 Duesenberg – Fred and August Duesenberg
 Duke Energy – James Buchanan Duke
 Duke Video – Peter Duke
 DuMont Television Network & DuMont Laboratories – Allen B. DuMont
 Dunlop – John Boyd Dunlop
 Dunlop Manufacturing – Jim Dunlop
 DuPont – Eleuthère Irénée du Pont
 Dyson – James Dyson

E
 Earnhardt Ganassi Racing with Felix Sabates – Dale Earnhardt (Sr.), Chip Ganassi, Felix Sabates
 Eastman Kodak – George Eastman
 Easton – Doug Easton
 Eatons – Timothy Eaton
 Eddie Bauer – Eddie Bauer
 Eddie Jordan Racing – Eddie Jordan
 Eddie Stobart – see Stobart Group
 Edelbrock – Vic Edelbrock
 Edison Records – Thomas Edison
 Eggenberger Motorsport, Rudi Eggenberger
 Eli Lilly and Company – Eli Lilly
 Ellis Briggs – Leonard Ellis and Thomas Briggs
 Ericsson – Lars Magnus Ericsson
 Ermenegildo Zegna – Ermenegildo Zegna
 Ernst Paul Lehmann Patentwerk
 Estée Lauder Companies – Estée Lauder
 EuroBrun – Walter Brun

F
 Fabbri Group – Romolo Fabbri
 Faber and Faber – Geoffrey Faber
 Faber-Castell – Kaspar Faber
 Falabella – Salvatore Falabella
 Fazer – Karl Fazer
 FB Mondial – Fratelli Boselli
 Felt Bicycles – Jim Felt
 Fender – Leo Fender
 Fendi – Edoardo Fendi
 Ferguson Research – Harry Ferguson
 Ferragamo – Salvatore Ferragamo
 Ferranti – Sebastian Ziani de Ferranti
 Ferrari – Enzo Ferrari
 Ferrero – Pietro Ferrero
 Ferretti Group – Alessandro and Norberto Ferretti
 Fielmann – Günther Fielmann
 Filippi Boats – Filippi Lido
 Fioravanti – Leonardo Fioravanti
 Fisher-Price – Herman Fisher and Irving Price
 Fitch Ratings – John Knowles Fitch
 Fittipaldi Automotive – Emerson and Wilson Fittipaldi
 Focke-Wulf – Henrich Focke and Georg Wulf (1895–1927)
 Fokker – Anthony Fokker
 Forbes – B. C. Forbes
 Ford Motor Company – Henry Ford
 Forti – Guido Forti
 Fortinos – John Fortino
 Fortnum & Mason – William Fortnum and Hugh Mason
 Fox Racing – Geoff Fox
 Fox Racing Shox – Bob Fox
 Franck Muller – Franck Muller
 Frank Williams Racing Cars – Frank Williams
 Franklin Mint – believed to be named in honor of Benjamin Franklin
 FranklinCovey – Benjamin Franklin and Stephen Covey
 Frazer Nash – Archibald Frazer-Nash
 Fred Flare – Fred Astaire 
 Freisinger Motorsport – Manfred Freisinger
 Fresenius – Eduard Fresenius
 Frost French – Sadie Frost and Jemima French
 Frost and Sullivan – Lore A. Frost and Dan L. Sullivan
 Fuller, Smith & Turner – John Fuller, Henry Smith and John Turner

G
 Galen Institute – health care think tank named after Galen, a prominent Greek physician
 Galles Racing – Rick Galles
 Galmer – Rick Galles and Alan Mertens
 Gannett Company – Frank Gannett
 Garmin – Gary Burrell and Dr. Min Kao
 Gartner – Gideon Gartner
 Garry Rogers Motorsport – Garry Rogers
 Gemballa – Uwe Gemballa
 George Dickel – George A. Dickel
 Gerber Products Company – Daniel Frank Gerber
 Getty Images – Mark Getty
 Getty Oil – John Paul Getty
 Ghirardelli Chocolate Company – Domingo Ghirardelli
 Giannini – Tranquillo Giannini
 Gibson Guitar Corporation – Orville Gibson
 Gibson Motor Sport – Fred Gibson
 Gilbarco – Charles Gilbert and John Barker (Gilbert & Barker Manufacturing Co.)
 Gilera – Giuseppe Gilera
 Gillet – Tony Gillet
 Gillette – King C. Gillette
 Girard-Perregaux – Constant Girard and Marie Perregaux
 Gitzo – Arsène Gitzhoven
 Givenchy – Hubert de Givenchy
 Glenn L. Martin Company (to Lockheed Martin) – Glenn Luther Martin
 Glenn Seton Racing – Glenn Seton
 Glock Ges.m.b.H. – Gaston Glock
 GN – H.R. Godfrey and Archibald Frazer Nash
 Godin – Robert Godin
 Godrej Group – Ardeshir Godrej and Pirojsha Burjorji Godrej
 Goldman Sachs – Marcus Goldman and Samuel Sachs
 Goldwyn Picture Corporation – Samuel Goldfish, Edgar and Archibald Selwyn
 Goodrich Corporation – Benjamin Goodrich
 Goodyear Tire and Rubber Company – Charles Goodyear
 Gordon's Gin – Alexander Gordon
 Gottlieb – David Gottlieb
 Greggs – John Gregg
 Gresini Racing – Fausto Gresini
 Gretsch – Friedrich Gretsch
 GT Bicycles – Gary Turner
 Gucci – Guccio Gucci
 Guinness – Arthur Guinness
 Gumpert – Roland Gumpert
 Guthy-Renker – Bill Guthy and Greg Renker

H
 H-E-B – Howard Edward Butt (founder's son; turned the family grocery store into a supermarket chain)
 H. J. Heinz Company – Henry John Heinz
 H.K. Porter, Inc. – Henry Kirke Porter
 H&R Block – Henry W. Bloch and Richard Bloch
 Haas Automation – Gene Haas
 Haas Lola – Carl Haas
 Haas Outdoors, Inc. – Toxey Haas
 Hachette Filipacchi Médias – Louis Hachette and Daniel Filipacchi
 Halliburton – Erle P. Halliburton
 Halls, Hallmark Cards – Joyce Hall
 Hamann Motorsport – Richard Hamann
 Hamish Hamilton – Jamie Hamilton
 Hamleys – William Hamley
 Hämmerli – Johann Ulrich Hämmerli
 Hammond Organ – Laurens Hammond
 Hanna-Barbera Productions – William Hanna and Joseph Barbera
 Haribo – Hans Riegel (and produced in Bonn)
 Harley-Davidson – William S. Harley and Arthur Davidson
 Harman Kardon – Sidney Harman and Bernard Kardon
 Haro Bikes – Bob Haro
 HarperCollins – James Harper and William Collins
 Harrah's Entertainment – William F. Harrah
 Harrods – Charles Henry Harrod
 Harvey Nichols – Benjamin Harvey and James Nichols
 Harvey Norman – Gerald Harvey and Ian Norman
 Hasbro – the Hassenfeld Brothers
 Hasegawa Corporation – Suguro Hasegawa
 Hasselblad – Victor Hasselblad
 Hatchards – John Hatchard
 Heal's – John Harris Heal
 Hearst Corporation – William Randolph Hearst
 Heckler & Koch – Edmund Heckler and Theodor Koch
 Heineken International – Gerard Adriaan Heineken
 Heinemann – William Heinemann
 Hendrick Motorsports – Rick Hendrick
 Henkel – Friedrich Karl Henkel
 Hennessey Performance – John Hennessey
 Hennessy – Richard Hennessy
 The Herb Chambers Companies - Herb Chambers
 Herpa – Wilhelm Hergenröther (Hergenröther und Patente)
 The Hershey Company – Milton Hershey
 Hesburger – Heikki Salmela
 Hesketh Racing, Hesketh Motorcycles – Alexander Fermor-Hesketh, 3rd Baron Hesketh
 Heuer – see TAG Heuer
 Hewitt Associates – Ted Hewitt
 Hewlett-Packard – William Hewlett and David Packard
 Hillman – William Hillman
 Hilton Hotels – Conrad Hilton
 HKS – Hiroyuki Hasegawa and Goichi Kitagawa (plus Sigma Automotive)
 Hodder & Stoughton – Matthew Hodder and Thomas Wilberforce Stoughton
 Hohner – Matthias Hohner
 Holland & Barrett – William Holland and Alfred Slapps Barrett
 Holman Moody – John Holman and Ralph Moody
 Honda – Soichiro Honda
 Honeywell – Mark Honeywell
 Horlicks – James Horlick and William Horlick
 Hormel – George A. Hormel
 Hornby Railways – Frank Hornby
 Hoshino Impul – Kazuyoshi Hoshino
 House of Fabergé – Gustav Faberge
 Hovnanian Enterprises – Kevork Hovnanian
 Hughes Aircraft, Hughes Tool Company (to Baker Hughes), Hughes Airwest – Howard Hughes
 Hugo Boss – Hugo Boss
 Humber – Thomas Humber
 Huntley and Palmers – Joseph Huntley and George Palmer
 Hy-Vee – Charles Hyde and David Vredenburg. The company was originally incorporated as Hyde & Vredenburg, Inc.; Hy-Vee was adopted as a marketing brand in 1952 and the corporate name in 1963.

I
 Icahn Enterprises – Carl Icahn
 IKEA - Ingvar Kamprad from Elmtaryd in Agunnaryd 
 illy – Andrea Illy
 Ilmor – Mario Illien and Paul Morgan
 Ilyushin – Sergey Ilyushin
 Ind Coope – Edward Ind and Octavius Coope
 Ingle & Rhode – Tim Ingle and David Rhode
 Innocenti – Ferdinando Innocenti
 Irmscher – Günther Irmscher
 Islabikes – Isla Rowntree
 Italdesign Giugiaro – Giorgetto Giugiaro
 Isaac Imade Group – Isaac Imade

J
 J. Barbour & Sons – John Barbour
 J. C. Bamford – Joseph Cyril Bamford
 JCPenney – James Cash Penney
 J.J. Newberry – John Josiah Newberry
 J.P. Morgan & Co. – J. P. Morgan
 Jack Daniel Distillery – Jack Daniel
 Jack Link's Beef Jerky – John 'Jack' Link
 Jackson Guitars – Grover Jackson
 Jacksons of Piccadilly – Robert Jackson
 Jacob's – William and Robert Jacob
 Jacuzzi – the Jacuzzi brothers
 Jafco – Sidney Z. Jaffe
 James Purdey and Sons – James Purdey
 JBL – James Bullough Lansing
 Jean Coutu Group – Jean Coutu
 Jil Sander – Heidemarie "Jil" Sander
 The Jim Henson Company – Jim Henson
 Jimmy John's – Jimmy John Liautaud
 JML – John Mills (Limited)
 Jo-Han – John Hanley
 Joe Gibbs Racing – Joe Gibbs
 Joest Racing – Reinhold Joest
 John Cooper Works – John Cooper
 John Deere – John Deere
 John Murray – John Murray I
 John Player & Sons – John Player
 John Smith's Brewery – John Smith
 Johnnie Walker – John Walker
 Johnson & Johnson – Robert Wood Johnson I, James Wood Johnson, and Edward Mead Johnson
 Johnson Publishing – John H. Johnson
 Jones Lang Wootton – last names of its three principal members
 Jordan Grand Prix – Eddie Jordan
 JR Motorsports – Dale Earnhardt Jr. (Earnhardt is frequently referred to in NASCAR circles as "Junior")
 JTG Daugherty Racing – Jodi and Tad Geschickter, and Brad Daugherty
 Judd – John Judd
 Junkers – Hugo Junkers

K
 Kadokawa Shoten – Haruki Kadokawa
 Kaiser Aluminum, Kaiser Motors, Kaiser Permanente, Kaiser Shipyards, Kaiser Steel – Henry J. Kaiser
 Kaiser-Frazer – Henry J. Kaiser and Joseph W. Frazer
 Kärcher – Alfred Kärcher
 Karstadt – Rudolph Karstadt
 Kate Spade New York – Kate Spade
 Kawasaki Heavy Industries – Kawasaki Shōzō
 Kellogg Company – Will Keith Kellogg
 Kelly Racing – John and Margaret Kelly
 The Kennedy/Marshall Company – Kathleen Kennedy and Frank Marshall
Kenwood Limited – Kenneth Maynard Wood
 Kevin Harvick Incorporated – Kevin Harvick
 Kimberly-Clark – John A. Kimberly and Charles B. Clark
 King Kullen – Michael J. Cullen; he replaced the "C" with a "K" for marketing purposes
 Knight Ridder – John S. Knight (Knight Newspapers, Inc.) and Herman Ridder (Ridder Publications, Inc.)
 Koch Industries – Fred C. Koch
 Koch Media – Franz Koch
 Koei – Kō Shibusawa and Eiji Fukuzawa (non-existent people)
 Koenigsegg – Christian von Koenigsegg
Kogan.com – Ruslan Kogan
 Kohlberg Kravis Roberts – Jerome Kohlberg Jr., Henry Kravis, and George R. Roberts
 Kohl's – Max Kohl
 Kojima Engineering – Matsuhisa Kojima
 Kojima Productions – Hideo Kojima
 Konami – Kagemasa Kouzuki, Yoshinobu Nakama, Tatuso Miyasako (another theory was Hiro Matsuda, and Shokichi Ishihara)
 Konrad Motorsport – Franz Konrad
 Kraft Foods – James L. Kraft
 Kremer Racing – Erwin and Manfred Kremer
 Kroger – Bernard Kroger
 Kruse International – Russell W. Kruse
 Kurtis Kraft – Frank Kurtis
 Kuzma – Eddie Kuzma
 Kwanon – Kannon (Japanese for the Buddhist bodhisattva Guan Yin)

L
 L.L.Bean – Leon Leonwood Bean
 Lacoste – Jean René Lacoste (1904–1996)
 Lafarge – Joseph-Auguste Pavin de Lafarge
 Lagardère Group – Jean-Luc Lagardère
 Laidlaw – Robert Laidlaw
 Lamborghini – Ferruccio Lamborghini
 Lancia – Vicenzo Lancia
 Lane Bryant – Lena Bryant (first name misspelled by a bank officer when she opened her company's first bank account)
 Larrousse – Gérard Larrousse
 Lauda Air – Niki Lauda
 Lavazza – Luigi Lavazza
 Laverda – Pietro Laverda
 Lazard – Alexandre Lazard, Simon Lazard, and Elie Lazard
 LDS – Louis Douglas Serrurier
 Leatherman – Timothy S. Leatherman
 Lee Enterprises – A. W. Lee
 Leeann Chin – Leeann Chin
 Lehman Brothers – Henry Lehman, Emanuel Lehman, and Meyer Lehman
 J. Lehrenkrauss Corporation
 Leica Camera, Leica Geosystems and Leica Microsystems – Ernst Leitz II (Leitz Camera)
 Leitz – Louis Leitz
 LeMond Racing Cycles – Greg LeMond
 Leslie – Donald Leslie
 Lesney Products – Leslie Smith and Rodney Smith
 Levi Strauss & Co. – Levi Strauss
 Li-Ning – Li Ning
 Liberty – Arthur Lasenby Liberty
 Lidl – named for Ludwig Lidl
 Life – Ernesto Vita (surname is Italian for life)
 Ligier – Guy Ligier
 Lincoln Motor Company – Abraham Lincoln
 Lincoln National Corporation – to convey the integrity of U.S. President Abraham Lincoln
 Linde Group – Carl von Linde
 Lipton – Thomas Lipton
 Lisa Frank Incorporated – Lisa Frank
 Livingston International – Gerry Livingston
 Liz Claiborne – Liz Claiborne
 Lloyds Bank – Sampson Lloyd
 Lloyd's of London – Edward Lloyd
 Loblaws – Theodore Loblaw
 Lockheed Corporation (to Lockheed Martin) – Allan Haines Loughead and Malcolm Loughead
 Loews Theatres and Loews Corporation – Marcus Loew
 Longman – Thomas Longman
 Lonsdale – Hugh Cecil Lowther, 5th Earl of Lonsdale
 Lorillard Tobacco Company – Pierre Abraham Lorillard
 Lotte – The Sorrows of Young Werther character Charlotte
 Loud Brothers – Thomas Loud Jr., Philologus Loud, John Loud, and Joseph Loud
 Louis B. Mayer Pictures (to Metro-Goldwyn-Mayer) – Louis B. Mayer
 Louis Vuitton – Louis Vuitton
 Lowe Alpine and its offshoot Lowepro – Greg, Jeff, and Mike Lowe (founders)
 Lucasfilm – George Lucas
 LVMH – see separate entries of Louis Vuitton, Moët et Chandon, and Hennessy

M
 M. D. Moody & Sons, Inc. – Maxey Dell Moody, Sr.
 Macmillan – Daniel and Alexander Macmillan
 Macy's – Rowland Hussey Macy
 Mahindra Group – K.C. Mahindra and J.C. Mahindra, India
 Maki – Mimur A Kenji
 Makita – Mosaburo Makita
 Malaguti – Antonio Malaguti
 Mamiya – Seichi Mamiya
 Manfrotto Group – Lino Manfrotto
 Manion's – Ron Manion 
 Mansory – Kourosh Mansory
 March Engineering – initials of Max Mosley, Alan Rees, Graham Coaker, and Robin Herd
 Marchese – Carl Marchese
 Marconi Company – Guglielmo Marconi
 Marcus Marshall Motorsport – Marcus Marshall
 Mark Levinson – Mark Levinson
 Marks & Spencer – Michael Marks and Thomas Spencer
 Marriott Corporation (later split into Host Marriott and Marriott International) – J. Willard Marriott
 Mars, Incorporated – Frank C. Mars
 Marsh & McLennan Companies – Henry W. Marsh and Donald R. McLennan
 Marshall Amplification – Jim Marshall
 Martha Stewart Living Omnimedia – Martha Stewart
 Martin-Baker – James Martin and Valentine Baker
 Martini – Tico Martini
 Martini & Rossi – Alessandro Martini and Luigi Rossi
 Mary Kay, Inc. – Mary Kay Ash
 Marzotto – Luigi Marzotto
 Matsushita Electric Industrial – Konosuke Matsushita
 Matrox – Branko Matić and Lorne Trottier (and excellence)
 Mattel – Harold Matt Matson and Elliot Handler
 Mauser – Wilhelm and Paul Mauser
 Max Factor – Max Factor, Sr (born Maksymilian Faktorowicz)
 Maybach – Wilhelm and Karl Maybach
 Maytag – F. L. Maytag
 Mazda – Jujiro Matsuda, also possibly inspired by the Zoroastrian god Ahura Mazda
 MB – Milton Bradley
 McAfee – John McAfee
 McCaw Cellular – Craig McCaw
 McDonald's – Richard and Maurice McDonald
 McDonnell Aircraft (to McDonnell Douglas) – James Smith McDonnell
 Todd McFarlane Productions, McFarlane Toys – Todd McFarlane
 McGraw-Hill – John A. Hill and James H. McGraw
 McKesson Corporation – John McKesson
 McLaren – Bruce McLaren
 McVitie's – Robert McVitie
 Meijer – Hendrik Meijer
 Melitta – Melitta Bentz
 Mellon Financial Corporation – Thomas Mellon
 Menards – John Menard Jr.
 Mercedes – named by Emil Jellinek for his daughter Mercédès Jellinek
 Mercedes-Benz – Karl Benz
 Merck – Friedrich Jacob Merck
 Meredith Corporation – Edwin T. Meredith
 Merriam-Webster – George and Charles Merriam, and Noah Webster
 Merrill Lynch – Charles E. Merrill and Edmund C. Lynch
 Merzario – Arturo Merzario
 Messerschmitt – Willy Messerschmitt
 Methuen – Algernon Methuen
 MG Cars – William Morris, 1st Viscount Nuffield (Morris Garages)
 MGM or Metro-Goldwyn-Mayer – Samuel Goldfish, Edgar and Archibald Selwyn, and Louis B. Mayer
 Michael Kors Holdings – Michael Kors
 Michael Waltrip Racing – Michael Waltrip
 Miele – Carl Miele
 Mikoyan – Artem Mikoyan
 Millarworld – Mark Millar
 MillenWorks – Rod Millen
 Minardi – Giancarlo Minardi
 Miramax Films – Miriam and Max Weinstein (parents of founders)
 Mitel – Michael Cowpland and Terry Matthews (Mike and Terry's Lawnmowers)
 Mitsuoka – Akio Mitsuoka
 Moët et Chandon – Claude Moët and Pierre-Gabriel Chandon de Briailles
 Molson – John Molson
 Momo – Giampiero Moretti (Moretti Monza)
 Mondadori – Arnoldo Mondadori
 Montague Bikes – David Montague
 Monteverdi – Peter Monteverdi
 Moog Music – Dr. Robert Moog
 Morbidelli – Giancarlo Morbidelli
 Morgan Motor Company – H.F.S. Morgan
 Morgan Stanley – Henry S. Morgan and Harold Stanley
 Morris Motors – William Morris, 1st Viscount Nuffield
 Morton Salt – Joy Morton
 Mosler Automotive – Warren Mosler
 Moto Guzzi – Carlo Guzzi
 Moto Morini – Alfonso Morini
 Mr. Gatti's Pizza – Pat Eure, née Gatti, wife of company founder Jim Eure
 MTM Enterprises – Mary Tyler Moore
 Murphy's Brewery – James J. Murphy
 MV Agusta – Vincenzo and Domenico Agusta
 Myer – Sidney Myer

N
 Nakajima Racing – Satoru Nakajima
 Nakamichi – Etsuro Nakamichi
 Namco – Masaya Nakamura (Nakamura Manufacturing Company)
 Nardi – Enrico Nardi
 Nash Motors – Charles W. Nash
 Neckermann – Josef Neckermann
 Neiman Marcus – Herbert Marcus, Sr., Carrie Marcus Neiman, and A. L. Neiman
 Nero AG – Nero
 Nestlé – Henri Nestlé
 Newman/Haas/Lanigan Racing – Paul Newman, Carl Haas, and Mike Lanigan
 Newman's Own – Paul Newman
 Nick Bollettieri Tennis Academy – Nick Bollettieri
 Nielsen – Arthur Nielsen
 Niki – Niki Lauda
 Nobel Enterprises – Alfred Nobel
 Norbert Dentressangle – Norbert Dentressangle
 Nordstrom – John W. Nordstrom
 Northrop – Jack Northrop

O
 Offenhauser – Fred Offenhauser
 Office Kitano – Takeshi Kitano
 Öhlins – Kenth Öhlins
 Oldsmobile – Ransom E. Olds
 Olin Corporation – Franklin W. Olin
 Olivetti – Camillo Olivetti
 Orton Ceramic Foundation – Edward Orton Jr.
 Osella – Enzo Osella
 Otis Elevator Company – Elisha Otis
 Otto GmbH – Michael Otto

P
 Pagani – Horacio Pagani
 Pamida – Patrick, Michael, and David Witherspoon, sons of company co-founder Jim Witherspoon
 Panhard – René Panhard
 Panoz – Don Panoz
 Papa John's Pizza – "Papa" John Schnatter
 Patek Philippe & Co. – Antoni Patek and Adrien Philippe
 Pathé – Charles and Émile Pathé
 Paul Cruickshank Racing – Paul Cruickshank
 Paul Frank Industries – Paul Frank
 Paul K. Guillow, Inc. – Paul K. Guillow
 Paul Morris Motorsport – Paul Morris
 Peavey Electronics – Hartley Peavey
 Peek Freans – James Peek and George Hender Frean
 Penske Corporation – Roger Penske
 Penske Media Corporation – Jay Penske, the son of Roger Penske
 PerkinElmer – Richard Scott Perkin and Charles Elmer
 Perot Systems – H. Ross Perot Jr.
 Perry Ellis International – Perry Ellis
 Petty Enterprises – Lee Petty
 Peugeot – Armand Peugeot
 Pfizer – Charles Pfizer
 Philip Morris International and Philip Morris USA – Philip Morris
 Philips – Gerard Philips
 Piaggio – Rinaldo Piaggio
 Pinarello – Giovanni Pinarello
 Pininfarina – Sergio Pininfarina
 Pirelli – Giovanni Battista Pirelli
 Pontiac – Chief Pontiac
 Porsche – Ferdinand Porsche
 Porsche Design – Ferdinand Alexander Porsche
 Powell Peralta – George Powell and Stacy Peralta
 Prada – Mario Prada
 Pramac d'Antin – Luis d'Antin
 Pratt & Whitney – Francis A. Pratt, Amos Whitney
 Pressman Toy Corporation – Jack Pressman
 PricewaterhouseCoopers – Samuel Lowell Price, Edwin Waterhouse, William Cooper
 Primanti Brothers – Joe Primanti, Dick Primanti, Stanley Primanti
 Procter & Gamble – William Procter and James Gamble
 Promotions Varoussac, original name of the wrestling promotion later known as Lutte Internationale – Frank Valois, André Roussimoff (aka André the Giant), Louis Accocella (aka Gino Brito)
 Prost Grand Prix – Alain Prost
 PRS Guitars – Paul Reed Smith
 Pye – William George Pye

Q
 Quaife – Rod Quaife
 Qvale – Bruce Qvale

R
 R. J. Reynolds Tobacco Company (RJR) – R. J. Reynolds
 Railton – Reid Railton
 Rainer-Wurz.com – Markus Rainer and Alexander Wurz
 Ralt – Ron and Austin Lewis Tauranac
 RAM Racing – Mike Ralph and John Macdonald
 Rawlings – George and Alfred Rawlings
 RE Amemiya – Asami Amemiya
 Rebaque – Héctor Rebaque
 Reed - Alec Reed
 Reiter Engineering – Hans Reiter
 Renault – Louis Renault
 Rensi-Hamilton Racing – Ed and Sam Rensi, and Bobby Hamilton Jr.
 REO Motor Car Company – Ransom E. Olds
 Reuters – Paul Reuter
 Reynard Motorsport – Adrian Reynard
 Richard Childress Racing – Richard Childress
 Richard Petty Motorsports – Richard Petty
 Rickenbacker – Adolph Rickenbacher
 Riddell – John Tate Riddell
 Rieger Tuning – Toni Rieger
 Riese und Müller – Markus Riese and Heiko Müller
 Riley & Scott – Bob Riley and Mark Scott
 Riley Motor – William Riley Jr.
 Riley Technologies – Bob and Bill Riley
 Rimac Automobili – Mate Rimac
 Rinspeed – Frank Rinderknecht
 Ripspeed – Keith Ripp
 Rizzoli-Corriere della Sera – Angelo Rizzoli
 RM Auctions – Rob Myers
 R. M. Williams – Reginald Murray Williams
 RML Group – Ray Mallock
 Robeez – Sandra Wilson's son Robert
 Robert Bosch GmbH – Robert Bosch
 Robert Yates Racing – see Yates Racing
 Roberts Radio – Harry Roberts
 Rockefeller Group – John D. Rockefeller Jr.
 Rockwell International, North American Rockwell, Rockwell Semiconductor – Willard Rockwell
 Rod Millen Motorsports – see MillenWorks
 Rod Nash Racing – Rod Nash
 Rogers Communications – Edward S. "Ted" Rogers
 Rogers Locomotive and Machine Works – Thomas Rogers
 Rogers Vacuum Tube Company – Edward S. Rogers, Sr.
 Rolls-Royce plc, Rolls-Royce Motor Cars – Charles Rolls and Henry Royce
 Rondel Racing – Ron Dennis and Neil Trundle
 Rootes Group (now part of Stellantis) – William Rootes
 Rossetti Architects – Gino Rossetti and Matthew L. Rossetti
 Rothmans – Louis Rothman
 Roush Performance, Roush Fenway Racing – Jack Roush
 Rowntree's – Henry Isaac Rowntree
 RPG Group – Rama Prasad Goenka, India
 RSA Security – Ronald Rivest, Adi Shamir, and Len Adleman
 Rudge-Whitworth – Daniel Rudge
 Ruf Automobile – Alois Ruf
 Russell & Bromley – Albion Russell and George Frederick Bromley
 Ryanair – Tony Ryan

S
 S.C. Johnson & Son – Samuel Curtis Johnson, Sr.
 Sainsbury's – John James Sainsbury
 Saks Fifth Avenue – Andrew Saks
 Saleen – Steve Saleen
 Sam's Club – Sam Walton
 Samsonite – Samson
 Samuel Smith Brewery – Samuel Smith
 Santoni – Andrea and Rosa Santoni
 Sauber – Peter Sauber
 Savoia-Marchetti – Umberto Savoia and Alessandro Marchetti
 Sbarro (U.S. pizza restaurant chain) – Gennaro and Carmela Sbarro
 Sbarro (Swiss automaker) – Franco Sbarro
 Schlecker – Anton Schlecker
 Schnitzer Motorsport – Josef and Herbert Schnitzer
 SCHWIND eye-tech-solutions – Herbert Schwind
 Schwinn Bicycle Company – Ignaz Schwinn
 Scott – Ed Scott
 Sears – Richard Warren Sears
 formerly Sears, Roebuck – Sears and Alvah Roebuck
 Seeburg Corporation – Justus Sjöberg (Anglicized name)
 Seecamp – Ludwig Wilhelm "Louis" Seecamp
 Seedorf Racing – Clarence Seedorf
 Selfridges – Harry Gordon Selfridge
 Sennheiser electronic – Fritz Sennheiser
 Shakespeare Fishing Tackle – William Shakespeare Jr.
 Shanghai Tang – David Tang
 Shaw Brothers Studio, Shaw Organisation – Run Run Shaw and Runme Shaw
 Sheetz – Bob Sheetz
 Sherwin-Williams Company – Henry Sherwin and Edward Williams
 Shimano – Shozaburo Shimano
 Shugart Associates – Alan Shugart
 Shure Incorporated – Sidney Shure
 Siemens AG – Werner von Siemens
 Sikorsky Aircraft – Igor Sikorsky
 Simpson Performance Products – Bill Simpson
 Sinclair Broadcast Group – Julian Sinclair Smith
 Sinclair Radionics, Sinclair Research, Sinclair Vehicles – Clive Sinclair
 Singer Corporation – Isaac Merritt Singer
 Singer Motors – George Singer
 Skip Barber Racing School – Skip Barber
 Smirnoff – Piotr Arsenieyevich Smirnov
 Smith and Nephew – Thomas James Smith and nephew Horatio Nelson Smith
 Smith & Wesson – Horace Smith and Daniel B. Wesson
 Soennecken – Friedrich Soennecken
 Sopwith Aviation Company – Thomas Sopwith
 Sotheby's – John Sotheby
 Spice Engineering – Gordon Spice
 SROGs – Henry Varnum Poor
 Stanley Black & Decker – Frederick Trent Stanley, S. Duncan Black, and Alonzo G. Decker
 formerly Stanley Works, named after the aforementioned Stanley
 Steinway & Sons – Henry E. Steinway
 Stern – Sam Stern
 Stewart Grand Prix – Jackie and Paul Stewart
 Stewart Haas Racing – Tony Stewart and Gene Haas (via Haas Automation)
 Stewart-Warner – John K. Stewart and Arthur P. Warner
 Stihl – Andreas Stihl
 Stillen – Steve Millen
 Stobart Group – Eddie Stobart
 Stockmann – Georg Franz Stockmann
 Stone Brothers Racing – Ross and Jim Stone
 Strömberg – Gottfrid Strömberg
 Sturm, Ruger – Alexander McCormick Sturm and William B. Ruger
 Stutz Motor Company – Harry C. Stutz
 Sukhoi – Pavel Sukhoi
 Sullivan Bluth Studios – Don Bluth and Morris Sullivan
 Sumitomo Group – Sumitomo Masatomo
 Super Aguri F1 – Aguri Suzuki
 Surtees – John Surtees
 Suzuki – Michio Suzuki
 Suzy Levian New York – Souzana Levian
 Swarovski – Daniel Swarovski

T
 Taco Bell – Glen Bell
 Taft Broadcasting – Charles Phelps Taft
 TAG Heuer – Eduardo Heuer
 Tamiya – Yoshio Tamiya
 Tandy Corporation – Dave L. Tandy
 Tanfoglio – Tanfoglio Giuseppe
 Taser International – Thomas A. Swift's Electric Rifle
 Tata Group – Jamsetji Tata, India
 Tate & Lyle – Henry Tate and Abram Lyle
 Taylor Wimpey – Frank Taylor and George Wimpey
 Taylor Woodrow – Frank Taylor and Jack Woodrow
 Teacher's Highland Cream – William Teacher
 Team Goh – Kazimuchi Goh
 Team LCR – Lucio Cecchinello
 Ten Kate Racing – Gerrit ten Kate, named after his nephew Ronald's motorcycle dealership Ten Kate Motorcycles
 Terrytoons – Paul Terry
 Tesco – T.E. Stockwell and Jack Cohen
 Tesla Motors – Nikola Tesla
 Testor Corporation – Nils Testor
 Tetley's Brewery (Joshua Tetley & Sons) – Joshua Tetley
 Theakston Brewery – Robert Theakston
 Thomas B. Jeffery Company – Thomas B. Jeffery
 Thomas Cook Group, Thomas Cook Airlines, Thomas Cook & Son – Thomas Cook
 The Thomson Corporation – Roy Thomson, 1st Baron Thomson of Fleet
 Various named after Elihu Thomson:
Alstom
Thomson-CSF (now Thales Group)
Thomson-Houston Electric Company (now General Electric)
Thomson SA (now Technicolor SA)
 Thorn Electrical Industries – Jules Thorn
 Thorntons (British chocolatier) – Joseph William Thornton
 Thorntons (U.S. convenience store chain) – James H. Thornton
 Thrupp & Maberly (former coachbuilders) – George Thrupp and George Maberly
 THX – Tomlinson Holman
 ThyssenKrupp – Thyssen family and the Krupp family
 Tiffany & Co. – Charles Lewis Tiffany
 Tiffen – Sol Tiffen
 Tim Hortons – Tim Horton
 Timken Company – Henry Timken
 Tinsley & Hull – Fleming Davies Tinsley and Daniel B. Hull 
 Tokuma Shoten – Yasuyoshi Tokuma
 Toleman – Ted Toleman
 Tom Walkinshaw Racing – Tom Walkinshaw
 Tommy Hilfiger – Tommy Hilfiger
 Tommy Kaira – Yoshikazu Tomita and Kikuo Kaira
 TOM'S – Nobuhide Tachi and Kiyoshi Oiwa (Tachi Oiwa Motor Sport)
 Tom's of Maine – Tom and Kate Chappell
 Toni & Guy – Giuseppe "Toni" and Gaetano "Guy" Mascolo
 Tony Roma's – Tony Roma
 Towers Perrin – John Towers and Charles Perrin
 Toyota Industries – Sakichi Toyoda
 Toyota Motor – Kiichiro Toyoda
 Trane – James and Reuben Trane
 Triple F Racing – Paul, Todd, and Dean Fiore
 Trump Organization – Fred Trump
 Trump Shuttle, Trump Entertainment Resorts, Trump Taj Mahal Casino Resort – Donald Trump
 Tupolev – Andrei Tupolev
 Tupperware Brands – Earl Tupper
 Turner Broadcasting System – Ted Turner
 TVR – Trevor Wilkinson
 TVS Motors, TVS Electronics – T.V. Sundaram Iyengar, India
 Twinings – Thomas Twining
 Tyrrell Racing – Ken Tyrrell

U
 Ukrop's – Joseph Ukrop
 Umbro – Harold and Wallace Humphreys (Humphrey Brothers)

V
 Valentino – Valentino Garavani
 Vanwall – Tony Vandervell (and Thinwall bearings)
 VDL Bova – J.D. Bova
 Veilside – Hiranao Yokomaku; "yoko" translates as "side" and "maku" as "veil"
 Vel’s Parnelli Jones Racing – Velco "Vel" Miletich and Parnelli Jones
 Versace – Gianni Versace
 Verville Aircraft Company – Alfred V. Verville
 Vibram – Vitale Bramani
 Vroom & Dreesmann – Willem Vroom and Anton Dreesmann

W
 W.B. Mason – William Betts Mason
 W H Smith – William Henry Smith
 W. R. Grace and Company – William Russell Grace
 W. W. Norton – William Warder Norton
 Waitrose – Wallace Waite and Arthur Rose
 Walmart – Sam Walton
 Walgreens – Charles Rudolph Walgreen
 Walkinshaw Andretti United – Tom Walkinshaw, Michael Andretti
 Wall's (ice cream) and Wall's (meat) – Richard Wall
 The Walt Disney Company – Walt Disney
 Walther – Carl Walther
 Walter Wolf Racing – Walter Wolf
 Wang Laboratories – An Wang
 Warburtons – Ellen and Thomas Warburton
 Warner Bros. – Jack L. Warner, Sam Warner, Harry Warner, and Albert Warner
 Wegmans – John and Walter Wegman
 Wells Fargo – Henry Wells and William Fargo
 Wendy's – Dave Thomas' daughter Melinda "Wendy" Thomas
 Weslake – Harry Weslake
 Westinghouse Electric – George Westinghouse
 Whitbread – Samuel Whitbread
 Whyte & Mackay – James Whyte and Charles Mackay
 Wiesmann – Martin and Friedhelm Wiesmann
 Wilko (formerly Wilkinson) – James Kemsey Wilkinson
 Will Vinton Productions – Will Vinton
 Willi Betz – Willi Betz
 William Hill plc – William Hill
 Williams Grand Prix Engineering – Frank Williams
 Williams Manufacturing Company, (to) Williams Electronics – see WMS Industries
 Williams Sonoma – Chuck Williams (author)
 Wilson Combat – Bill Wilson
 Winchester, Winchester Repeating Arms – Oliver Winchester
 Winning Appliances – John Winning and the Winning family
 WMS Industries, WMS Gaming – Harry E. Williams
 Wolfram Research - Stephen Wolfram
 Wood Brothers Racing – Glen, Leonard, Delano, Clay, and Ray Lee Wood
 Woolworths – F. W. Woolworth
 Worthington Brewery – William Worthington
 Wright Company, Wright Aeronautical (to Wright-Martin) – Orville and Wilbur Wright
 Wrigley Company – William Wrigley Jr.
 Würth – Adolf Würth

X

Y
 Yakovlev – Alexander Sergeyevich Yakovlev
 Yamaha Corporation – Torakusu Yamaha
 Yates Racing – Robert Yates
 Yokomo – Tomoaki Yokobori (spun off from a model shop named Yokobori Model Shop)
 Young's (now Wells & Young's Brewery) – Charles Young
 Yuke's – Yukinori Taniguchi
 Yves Saint Laurent – Yves Saint Laurent

Z
 Zagato – Ugo Zagato
 Zakspeed – Erich Zakowski
 Zend Technologies – Zeev Suraski & Andi Gutmans
 Ziff Davis – William Bernard Ziff Sr. and Bernard George Davis
 Zust – Roberto Züst

References

Lists of companies
Lists of eponyms
Corporation-related lists